Paisley Park Soccer Complex in Victoria, Australia provides the facilities for local soccer club Altona Magic, who play in National Premier Leagues Victoria and are supported by the Macedonian Australian community. The stadium has a capacity of 5,000. The Altona East Phoenix, who currently participate in the Victorian State League Division 1 N/W, also share the facilities, and are predominantly backed by the local Greek Australian community.

Established in 1975 by the local City of Hobsons Bay Council, the facilities received an upgrade in 2005, giving Altona Magic new clubrooms, while Altona East Phoenix moved in the shared facilities which are door to door apart with a large accordion-like door in the middle, allowing the facilities to be expanded, catering for 200 people.

External links
Altona Magic SC

Soccer venues in Melbourne
Sports venues in Melbourne
Buildings and structures in the City of Hobsons Bay
Sport in the City of Hobsons Bay